RFA Olna (A123) was the third and final of the three Ol-class "fast fleet tanker" of the Royal Fleet Auxiliary. Olna saw service in the Falklands War.

Background
Her design was a development of the Tide-class ships of the late 1950s. She was commissioned in 1966 and served in the RFA for 34 years. Olna was the third ship of the Royal Fleet Auxiliary to bear the name.

Operational history
Olna entered service as the UK was pulling back from its final large imperial garrisons. Much of the ship's early life was spent supporting routine deployments around the world.

1967-1968
In Operation Magister, Olna was part of the fleet covering the final British military withdrawal from Aden, along with nine other RFAs.

Falklands War
In 1982 Olna left for the South Atlantic as part of the second wave of ships to leave the UK during the Falklands War. That group was centred on the destroyer HMS Bristol. Once Olna reached theatre, her time was primarily spent fuelling the carrier battle group.

1983-2000
In 1990, another wartime deployment beckoned. As forces built up in the Persian Gulf, Olna joined the British task force on station. Olna arrived in August 1990, shortly after Iraq invaded Kuwait, and apart from a short maintenance period in Singapore was on station for the whole duration of the conflict. Olna operated further north than any other tanker as the US Navy was wary of mines after two ships had been severely damaged.

At the end of the 1990s, retirement was in sight. 1999 and 2000 were spent in mothballs at Gibraltar until the outbreak of a crisis in Sierra Leone called for Olna to make one last deployment. The ship did not proceed to Sierra Leone, but instead relieved other RFA vessels of participation in a major exercise off Scotland. Following this exercise, the ship returned to reserve and decommissioned soon thereafter.

Decommissioning
In March 2001, Olna was sold to a Turkish shipbreaking firm, but owing to the high quantity of asbestos aboard she was diverted to Greece before finally going to Indian breakers.

References

 O Class Fleet Replenishment Tankers

External links

Ol-class tankers (1965)
Falklands War naval ships of the United Kingdom
1965 ships
Gulf War ships of the United Kingdom